Sabine Steinbach (later Sabine Klemm, born 18 July 1952) is a German former swimmer. She competed at the 1968 Summer Olympics in the 200 m and 400 m individual medley events and finished in fourth and third place, respectively.

References

1952 births
Living people
Sportspeople from Chemnitz
German female swimmers
German female medley swimmers
Olympic swimmers of East Germany
Swimmers at the 1968 Summer Olympics
Olympic bronze medalists for East Germany
Olympic bronze medalists in swimming
Medalists at the 1968 Summer Olympics